Allegory of Virtue and Vice may refer to:

 Allegory of Virtue and Vice (Lotto)
 Allegory of Virtue and Vice (Veronese)